Eleutherodactylus varleyi is a species of frog in the family Eleutherodactylidae endemic to Cuba. Its natural habitats are subtropical or tropical moist lowland forest, subtropical or tropical seasonally wet or flooded lowland grassland, arable land, pastureland, plantations, rural gardens, urban areas, and heavily degraded former forest.

References

varleyi
Endemic fauna of Cuba
Amphibians of Cuba
Amphibians described in 1825
Taxonomy articles created by Polbot